Body fluids, bodily fluids, or biofluids, sometimes body liquids, are liquids within the human body. In lean healthy adult men, the total body water is about 60% (60–67%) of the total body weight; it is usually slightly lower in women (52-55%). The exact percentage of fluid relative to body weight is inversely proportional to the percentage of body fat. A lean  man, for example, has about 42 (42–47) liters of water in his body.

The total body of water is divided into fluid compartments, between the intracellular fluid compartment (also called space, or volume) and the extracellular fluid (ECF) compartment (space, volume) in a two-to-one ratio: 28 (28–32) liters are inside cells and 14 (14–15) liters are outside cells.

The ECF compartment is divided into the interstitial fluid volume – the fluid outside both the cells and the blood vessels – and the intravascular volume (also called the vascular volume and blood plasma volume) – the fluid inside the blood vessels – in a three-to-one ratio: the interstitial fluid volume is about 12 liters; the vascular volume is about 4 liters.

The interstitial fluid compartment is divided into the lymphatic fluid compartment – about 2/3, or 8 (6–10) liters, and the transcellular fluid compartment (the remaining 1/3, or about 4 liters).

The vascular volume is divided into the venous volume and the arterial volume; and the arterial volume has a conceptually useful but unmeasurable subcompartment called the effective arterial blood volume.

Compartments by location
 intracellular fluid (ICF), which consist of cytosol and fluids in the cell nucleus
 Extracellular fluid
 Intravascular fluid (blood plasma)
 Interstitial fluid
 Lymphatic fluid (sometimes included in interstitial fluid)
 Transcellular fluid

Health
Body fluid is the term most often used in medical and health contexts. Modern medical, public health, and personal hygiene practices treat body fluids as potentially unclean. This is because they can be vectors for infectious diseases, such as sexually transmitted diseases or blood-borne diseases. Universal precautions and safer sex practices try to avoid exchanges of body fluids.  Body fluids can be analyzed in medical laboratory in order to find microbes, inflammation, cancers, etc.

Clinical samples
Clinical samples are generally defined as non-infectious human or animal materials including blood, saliva, excreta, body tissue and tissue fluids, and also FDA-approved pharmaceuticals that are blood products.  In medical contexts, it is a specimen taken for diagnostic examination or evaluation, and for identification of disease or condition.

Sampling
Methods of sampling of body fluids include:
 Blood sampling for any blood test, in turn including:
 Arterial blood sampling, such as radial artery puncture
 Venous blood sampling, also called venipuncture
 Lumbar puncture to sample cerebrospinal fluid
 Paracentesis to sample peritoneal fluid
 Thoracocentesis to sample pleural fluid
 Amniocentesis to sample amniotic fluid

See also
 Basic reproduction number
 Blood-borne diseases
 Clinical pathology
 Fluid bonding, unprotected sex in long-term relationships
 Humorism
 Hygiene
 Ritual cleanliness

References

Further reading
 Paul Spinrad. (1999) The RE/Search Guide to Bodily Fluids. Juno Books. 
 John Bourke. (1891)  Rites of All Nations. Washington, D.C.: W.H. Lowdermilk.

External links
 

 
Medical diagnosis
Medical terminology